Qasımlı or Kasymly may refer to:
Qasımlı, Agdam, Azerbaijan
Qasımlı, Gadabay, Azerbaijan
Qasımlı, Masally, Azerbaijan